Wychough is a former civil parish, now in the parish of Malpas, in the Cheshire West and Chester district, and ceremonial county of Cheshire in England. In 2001 it had a population of 11. The civil parish was abolished in 2015 and merged into Malpas. Its name was also formerly spelt Wichalgh.

Etymology
Like other placenames with the element wich(e) or wych(e) the name is a possibly a reference to the saline springs found within the parish at the hamlet of Lower Wych. The name was recorded in 1208 and 1347 as "Wychehalgh", with many variant spellings occurring in the following centuries.

History
Although Wychough was not mentioned in the Domesday Book, it was anciently a township of Malpas parish and a manor of the barony of Malpas. In the reign of Edward III the manor was in the possession of Philip de Egerton. As an administrative area that levied a separate rate, the township of Wychough became a civil parish subsequent to the Poor Law Amendment Act 1866.

See also

Listed buildings in Wychough

References

External links

Former civil parishes in Cheshire
Cheshire West and Chester
Malpas, Cheshire